List of East Japan Railway Company stations lists stations of the East Japan Railway Company (JR East), including lines serving the station and daily ridership.

Summary
The reported ridership is the most recent figure available, and represents average daily entries at each station, excluding in-system transfers. For “interface” stations that allow for through-servicing and transfers with other railways without exiting the station's paid area—e.g., Ayase on the Chiyoda Line—the reported ridership includes cross-company passengers on through-servicing trains (as part of trackage rights agreements) or transferring from other railways' trains without passing through faregates. For stations served by both Shinkansen and non-Shinkansen services, the reported ridership includes Shinkansen station entries.

Stations

Tokyo Suburban Area
For its services in the Greater Tokyo Area, JR East defines the Tokyo Suburban Area() for fare calculation purposes, roughly correlating with the Suica coverage area (as of 2012.03.17). However, Suica coverage does not extend to the Karasuyama Line, Kashima Line, and Kururi Line, which are considered part of the Tokyo Suburban Area. As of 2012.03.17, there are a total of 624 “unique” passenger stations (i.e., counting stations served by multiple lines only once) in the Tokyo Suburban Area, excluding Shinkansen-only stations (e.g., Honjō-Waseda)

Other

Notes

References

See also
List of railway stations in Japan

Japanese railway-related lists
Lists of railway stations in Japan
Transport in Tokyo
Tokyo-related lists